Keith Tindall (birth unknown) is an English former professional rugby league footballer who played in the 1970s and 1980s.

Playing career

International honours
Keith Tindall won a cap for England while at Hull in 1979 against France.

Challenge Cup Final appearances
Keith Tindall played left-, i.e. number 8, in Hull FC's 5-10 defeat by Hull Kingston Rovers in the 1980 Challenge Cup Final during the 1979–80 season at Wembley Stadium, London on Saturday 3 May 1980, in front of a crowd of 95,000, played left- (Trevor Skerrett having played in the first match) in the 18-9 victory over Widnes in the 1982 Challenge Cup Final replay during the 1981–82 season at Elland Road, Leeds on Wednesday 19 May 1982, in front of a crowd of 41,171.

BBC2 Floodlit Trophy Final appearances
Keith Tindall played left-, i.e. number 8, in Hull FC's 13-3 victory over Hull Kingston Rovers in the 1979 BBC2 Floodlit Trophy Final during the 1979-80 season at The Boulevard, Kingston upon Hull on Tuesday 18 December 1979.

Testimonial match
Keith Tindall's Testimonial match at Hull F.C. took place in 1982.

References

External links
Stats → Past Players → T at hullfc.com
Statistics at hullfc.com

Living people
England national rugby league team players
English rugby league players
Hull F.C. players
Place of birth missing (living people)
Rugby league props
Year of birth missing (living people)